Tirupati Assembly constituency is a constituency of Andhra Pradesh Legislative Assembly, India. It is one of the 7 constituencies in Tirupati district.

Overview
It is part of Tirupati Lok Sabha constituency along with another six Vidhan Sabha segments, namely, Sarvepalli, Gudur, Sullurpeta, Venkatagiri, Srikalahasti, Satyavedu in Tirupati district.

Mandals
Tirupati Assembly constituency consists of two mandals.

Members of Legislative assembly

Election results

2004

2009

2012 bypoll

2014

2015 Bypoll

2019

See also 
 List of constituencies of Andhra Pradesh Vidhan Sabha

References

Assembly constituencies of Andhra Pradesh